was a town located in Shisō District, Hyōgo Prefecture, Japan.

As of 2003, the town had an estimated population of 10,236 and a density of 47.85 persons per km2. The total area was 213.93 km2.

On April 1, 2005, Ichinomiya, along with the towns of Chikusa, Haga and Yamasaki (all from Shisō District), was merged to create the city of Shisō and no longer exists as an independent municipality.

Ichinomiya literally means "the first shrine" of the province. In case of this town, it is the Iwa Shrine of the Harima Province.

External links
 Official website of Shisō in Japanese

Dissolved municipalities of Hyōgo Prefecture
Shisō, Hyōgo